Spathebothriidae is a family of flatworms belonging to the order Spathebothriidea.

Genera:
 Spathebothrium Linton, 1922

References

Platyhelminthes